Sulcospira tonkiniana is a species of freshwater snail with an operculum, an aquatic gastropod mollusk in the family Pachychilidae.

Distribution
This species occurs in Vietnam.

Human use
It is a part of ornamental pet trade for freshwater aquaria.

References

Pachychilidae
Gastropods described in 1887